Monica Sandve (born 3 December 1973 in Vigrestad) is a Norwegian team handball player and Olympic medalist. She received a bronze medal at the 2000 Summer Olympics in Sydney with the Norwegian national team. She played 94 matches and scored 245 goals for the Norwegian national handball team between 1995 and 2003. In addition to the bronze medal at the 2000 Olympics, Sandve represented Norway when the team won a silver medal at the 2001 World Women's Handball Championship in Italy, as well as winning a silver medal at the 2002 European Women's Handball Championship in Denmark.

References

External links

1973 births
Living people
Norwegian female handball players
Olympic bronze medalists for Norway
People from Hå
Olympic medalists in handball
Medalists at the 2000 Summer Olympics
Handball players at the 2000 Summer Olympics
Sportspeople from Rogaland